Events in the year 1993 in the Republic of India.

Incumbents
 President of India – Shankar Dayal Sharma
 Prime Minister of India – P. V. Narasimha Rao
 Chief Justice of India – Lalit Mohan Sharma until 11 February, Manepalli Narayana Rao Venkatachaliah

Governors
 Andhra Pradesh – Krishan Kant 
 Arunachal Pradesh – Surendranath Dwivedy (until 4 July), Madhukar Dighe (4 July-20 October), Mata Prasad (starting 20 October)
 Assam – Loknath Mishra 
 Bihar – Mohammad Shafi Qureshi (until 13 August), Akhlaqur Rahman Kidwai (starting 13 August)
 Goa – Bhanu Prakash Singh 
 Gujarat – Sarup Singh
 Haryana – Dhanik Lal Mandal 
 Himachal Pradesh – 
 until 29 January: Virendra Verma
 11 February-29 June: Bali Ram Bhagat
 starting 11 February: Gulsher Ahmad
 Jammu and Kashmir – Girish Chandra Saxena (until 12 March), K. V. Krishna Rao (starting 12 March)
 Karnataka – Khurshed Alam Khan 
 Kerala – B. Rachaiah
 Madhya Pradesh – M. A. Khan (until 23 June), Mohammad Shafi Qureshi (starting 23 June)
 Maharashtra – C. Subramaniam (until 9 January), P.C. Alexander (starting 12 January)
 Manipur – 
 until 19 March: Chintamani Panigrahi
 20 March-30 August: K. V. Raghunatha Reddy 
 starting 31 August: V. K. Nayar
 Meghalaya – Madhukar Dighe
 Mizoram – Swaraj Kaushal (until 9 February), P. R. Kyndiah (starting 9 February)
 Nagaland – Loknath Mishra (until 1 October), V. K. Nayar (starting 1 October)
 Odisha – 
 until 1 February: Yagya Dutt Sharma 
 1 February-31 May: Saiyid Nurul Hasan
 starting 1 June: B. Satya Narayan Reddy
 Punjab – Surendra Nath 
 Rajasthan – 
 until 31 May: Marri Chenna Reddy 
 31 May-30 June: Dhanik Lal Mandal
 starting 30 June: Bali Ram Bhagat
 Sikkim – Radhakrishna Hariram Tahiliani 
 Tamil Nadu – Bhishma Narain Singh (until 30 May), Marri Chenna Reddy (starting 31 May)
 Tripura – K. V. Raghunatha Reddy (until 14 August), Romesh Bhandari (starting 14 August)
 Uttar Pradesh – B. Satya Narayan Reddy (until 25 May), Motilal Vora (starting 25 May)
 West Bengal – 
 until 12 July: Saiyid Nurul Hasan 
 12 July-14 August: B. Satyanarayan Reddy
 starting 14 August: K. V. Raghunatha Reddy

Events
 National income - 8,759,924 million
 9 March – The All Parties Hurriyat Conference is formed in Kashmir.
 12 March – A series of bomb blasts, thought to be planted by underworld figures, rock the country's commercial capital of Bombay, killing some 260 people. (See 1993 Mumbai bombings.)
 9 April – Veerappan Gang Trapped and blew a Tamil Nadu bus carrying police, forest officials and civilians, using a landmine, which killed 22 civilians and police[11] and this incident is known as Palar blast.
 14 April – Sun TV, a Tamil language television station, as first regular broadcasting service to start in Chennai, Tamil Nadu.
 24 May : Veerappan and His gang Killed 6 policemen K.M.Uthappa, Prabhakara, Poovaiah, Machaiah, Swamy and Narasappa of STF commander Gopal Hosur's party and injured the police commander near Rangaswamy vaddu, M.M.Hills, Karnataka.
 3 June - Chief minister of Kerala K. Karunakaran gravely injured following a road accident.
 30 September – The 6.2  Latur earthquake shakes Maharashtra, India with a maximum Mercalli intensity of VIII (Severe) killing 9,748 and injuring 30,000.
 5 December -Mulayam Singh Yadav elected chief minister of Uttar Pradesh for the second time.

Law

Births
 6 January – Pawan Negi, cricketer.
15 March  Alia Bhatt, actress and model.
 25 May - Rahul Yadav, chartered accountant.
1 April  Sri Divya, actress.
 26 June - Shivam Dube, cricketer
4 August  Malavika Mohanan, actress
 3 October – K. S. Bharat, cricketer
 11 October – Hardik Pandya, cricketer
 13 October – Hanuma Vihari, cricketer
 30 October – Aditi Rathore, Indian television actress
 6 December – Jasprit Bumrah, cricketer

Deaths
5 April – Divya Bharti, actress (born 1974)
3 August – Chinmayananda, spiritual leader (born 1916)
19 August – Utpal Dutt, actor, director and writer (born 1929).
7 November - Kirupanandha Variyar, spiritual teacher (born 1906).
29 November – J. R. D. Tata, French-born Indian aviator and businessman who became India's first licensed pilot (born 1904)

Full date unknown
Arun Joshi, novelist (born 1939)

See also 
 Bollywood films of 1993

References

 
India
Years of the 20th century in India